Aleksandra Rebikova was a Russian film actress.

Selected filmography 
 1916 — Dikaya sila
 1916 — Yamshchik, ne goni loshadey
 1918 — The Lady and the Hooligan

References

External links 
 Александра Ребикова on kino-teatr.ru

Russian film actresses
1896 births
1957 deaths